Kitāb al-bayān al-mughrib fī ākhbār mulūk al-andalus wa'l-maghrib (Book of the Amazing Story of the History of the Kings of al-Andalus and Maghreb)            by Ibn Idhāri (var. Ibn Athari) of Marrakech in the Maghreb (now Morocco); an important medieval Arabic history of the Maghreb and Iberia, written at Marrakech ca. 1312 / 712 AH . Generally known by its shorter title al-Bayān al-Mughrib (The Amazing Story), or even just as the Bayān, it is valued by modern researchers as a unique source of information, and for its preservation of excerpts from lost works.

Ibn Idhāri divides the work into three parts:
History of the Maghreb from the coming of Islam to the twelfth century
History of Al-Andalus (Muslim Iberia) over the same period
History of the Almoravids and Almohads

The Arabic text of the first two parts was first published in a Latin edition by Reinhart Dozy (1848-52); a second corrected edition of these two parts was published in 1948 by Colin and Levi-Provençal.

Several Spanish translations include a notable version by Ambrosio Huici Miranda, who originally published a part of the text as an anonymous work based on manuscripts from Madrid and Copenhagen and later the full text under Ibn Idhāri's name. A French translation by Fagnan (1901) based on Dozy's edition, received unfavourable reviews. However to date few translations of this work have been published.

Portions of the incomplete and insect-damaged manuscript of the third part were discovered in the 20th century. Despite lacking the beginning and end and several folios,  the preserved MS fragments importantly provide for the correction of many of errors and information omitted by the more widely known Rawd al-Qirtas.  An Arabic edition published by Ihsan Abbas (Beirut, 1983) includes the incomplete Part 3.

Notes

References
Spanish Translation of Parts 1 and 2: A. Huici Miranda, Colección de crónicas árabes de la Reconquista vols. 2 and 3, Tetuan, 1953-4.
Spanish Translation of Part 3: A. Huici Miranda, Al-Bayán al-Mugrib. Nuevos fragmentos almorávides y almohades. Anubar Ediciones, Valencia, 1963.
 N. Levtzion & J.F.P. Hopkins, Corpus of early Arabic sources for West African history, Cambridge University Press, 1981,  (reprint: Markus Wiener, Princeton, 2000). English translation of extracts dealing with the Almoravids.
Comparative notes (in English) on sources of Moroccan history during the Almoravid period by French historian Lagadère

1312 books
1310s
14th century in Morocco
History books about Algeria
History books about Morocco
History books about Spain
History books about the Iberian Peninsula

Iberian chronicles
Literature of the Marinid Sultanate